Separate Reality is a  traditional climbing route in Yosemite National Park in California. In 1986, German climber Wolfgang Güllich free soloed the route, and the photographs by Austrian  become iconic in rock climbing history.

History

Kauk named the route after the 1971 novel A Separate Reality by Carlos Castaneda. Kauk's partner, Lucy Parker, told Alpinist magazine that the book was: "a kind of handbook to help guide some of us back to the magic and mystery of life.... In a time when we don't even stop to ask why, the most important thing is to climb, to search".

In 1979, Ray Jardine made the first repeat of Separate Reality, and the photograph of his climb appeared on the covers of climbing books and magazines around the world, including the cover of Reinhold Messner's 1974 book, The Seventh Grade.

Inspired by the photo of Jardine, in 1986, German climber Wolfgang Güllich traveled to Yosemite, with Austrian photographer , and made the first free solo of Separate Reality. Güllich's 1986 free solo has since become an iconic feat in climbing history, and was listed on Red Bull's "10 Most Epic Free Solo Climbs". Güllich said after his feat: "An incredible feeling of joy melts all the tension and I suddenly have the impression that it was not a game of gambling with my life; it was not subjectively dangerous. I sit in the sun on the flat summit plateau - the 'other reality' is now part of the past. It is the thought of death that teaches us to value life." 

In 2005, 19 years later, Heinz Zak made the second free solo of the route. Zak said that in 1986, a free solo of the route "was completely out of my reach, not physically, but mentally", but that filming Güllich has set off an inner desire that he needed to resolve.  To prepare for the free solo, Zak had built a wooden model in his garage. His 2005 free solo was made into a 2017 short climbing film, Träume sterben nie (translated as Dreams never die).

In 2006, Dean Potter completed the third free solo of Separate Reality, a feat that he would repeat the four more times.

Notable ascents
 1978 Ron Kauk, first free ascent.

 1979 Ray Jardine, second free ascent.

 1986 Wolfgang Güllich, first free solo; photograph by  became inconic.

 2005 , second free solo.

 2006 Dean Potter, third free solo (Potter would go on to free solo the route five times in total).

 Others who have free soloed Separate Reality include American climber Alex Honnold, and Canadian climber Will Stanhope.

See also
The Nose (El Capitan), a  route in Yosemite 
Salathé Wall, a  route in Yosemite
Silence, first climb in the world with a potential grade of 
Jumbo Love, first climb in the world with a consensus grade of 
Realization/Biographie, first/second climb in the world with a consensus grade of 
Action Directe, first climb in the world with a consensus grade of 
Hubble, first climb in the world with a consensus grade of

References

External links 
 VIDEO:Heinz Zak's Film on Separate Reality, Gripped Magazine (September 2020)
 Films featuring Separate Reality, Mountain Film Database (MNTNFILM, 2023)

Climbing routes
Rock formations of California
Yosemite National Park